Gattya humilis, the snowdrop hydroid, is a delicate colonial hydroid in the family Halopterididae.

Description
Snowdrop hydroids are usually white and have small branches extending from a central stem. They may grow up to 3 cm in total height. The male gonophores (reproductive bodies) are smaller and more rounded than the female ones, which are goblet-shaped and contain only one egg each. Both sexes occur on the same stem.

Distribution
This colonial animal is found off the southern African coast from Northern Namibia to KwaZulu-Natal from the subtidal to 70m under water. It is only found in this region.

Ecology
This species often grows on coralline algae or weed.

References

Halopterididae
Animals described in 1885